Esdras Hartley (1892–1946) was the art director for the 1935 film Don't Bet on Blondes. He worked on over a hundred films during his career, many of them at the Hollywood studio Warner Brothers.

Selected filmography

 Miss Pacific Fleet (1935)
 A Night at the Ritz (1935)
 Bengal Tiger (1936)
 Times Square Playboy (1936)
 Talent Scout (1937)
 South of Suez (1940)
 River's End (1940)
 Ladies Must Live (1940)
 An Angel from Texas (1940)
 King of the Lumberjacks (1940)
 Three Cheers for the Irish ( 1940)
 The Case of the Black Parrot (1941)
 Flight from Destiny (1941)
 Highway West (1941)
 The Body Disappears (1941)

References

External links

1892 births
1946 deaths
American art directors